The Georgian national beach soccer team represents Georgia in international beach soccer competitions and is controlled by the Georgian Football Federation, the governing body for football in Georgia. The team has played competitively in two World Cup qualifiers, in 2008 and 2016, but have yet to win a match. The majority of the current squad also plays for club team FC Dinamo Batumi in Georgia who have competed in the Euro Winners Cup.

Current squad
Current as of September 2016

Coach: Jaba Tchanturia

Competitive record

FIFA Beach Soccer World Cup qualification (UEFA)

Achievements
2008 Season
 2008 FIFA Beach Soccer World Cup qualification
Group Stage
2016 Season
 2017 FIFA Beach Soccer World Cup qualification
Group Stage (T17th)

Sources

  Team profile on Beach Soccer Russia
 Team profile at Beach Soccer Worldwide

European national beach soccer teams